Taekwondo competitions at the 2021 Southeast Asian Games took place at Tây Hồ District Sporting Hall in Hanoi, Vietnam from 16 to 19 May 2022.

Medal table

Medalists

Poomsae

Men's kyorugi

Women's kyorugi

References

Taekwondo
2021